Damavaram is a village in Nellore district, Andhra Pradesh, India.

Villages in Nellore district